Solenostomataceae is a family of liverworts in the order  Jungermanniales.

Genera
Genera included in Solenostomataceae:
Aponardia (R.M.Schust) Váňa
Arctoscyphus Hässel
Cryptocolea R.M.Schust.
Diplocolea Amakawa
Solenostoma Mitt.

References

External links

Jungermanniales
Liverwort families